"Only the Light" is a song sung and written by Rikki (Richard Peebles) who performed the song at the Eurovision Song Contest 1987, representing the . It featured backing performance vocals from Catherine "Katie" Budd who had won Opportunity Knocks in 1977. The song placed at No. 96 on the UK Singles Chart.

Charts

References

Eurovision songs of the United Kingdom
Eurovision songs of 1987
1987 in the United Kingdom
1987 singles
1987 songs